Courtesan is a female courtier.

Courtesan may also refer to:

Role
A prostitute, catering to clients of wealth and status

Arts, entertainment, and media
Courtesan (film), a 1948 Mexican drama film
The Courtesans, a UK pop group fronted by Eileen Daly

Biology
Euripus (genus), a genus of brush-footed butterflies commonly known as the courtesans
Euripus nyctelius, a species in the genus Euripus commonly known as the courtesan